The Saveney Lake is a freshwater body attached to the Adolphe-Poisson Bay, located in the western part of the Gouin Reservoir, in the territory of the City of La Tuque, in the administrative region of Mauricie, in the province of Quebec, in Canada. This lake extends in the cantons of Hanotaux and Poisson.

Hydropower is the main economic activity of the sector. Forestry and recreational tourism activities, second.

The western side of the Saveney Lake and Adolphe-Poisson Bay watersheds are served by the R1009 forest road (North-South direction). This road also serves the entire western part of the Gouin Reservoir.

The surface of Saveney Lake is usually frozen from mid-November to the end of April, however, safe ice circulation is generally from early December to late March.

Geography

Toponymy
The French toponym "lac Saveney" was formalized on December 5, 1968, by the Commission de toponymie du Québec, i.e. at the creation of this Commission.

Notes and references

See also 

Lakes of Mauricie
La Tuque, Quebec